The 2015 Kremlin  Cup was a tennis tournament played on indoor hard courts. It was the 26th edition of the Kremlin Cup for the men and the 20th edition for the women. The tournament was part of the ATP World Tour 250 Series of the 2015 ATP World Tour, and of the Premier Series of the 2015 WTA Tour. It was held at the Olympic Stadium in Moscow, Russia, from 19 October through 25 October 2015.

Points and prize money

Point distribution

Prize money

ATP singles main-draw entrants

Seeds

 Rankings are as of October 12, 2015

Other entrants
The following players received wildcards into the singles main draw:
  Evgeny Donskoy
  Cem İlkel
  Andrey Rublev

The following players received entry from the qualifying draw:
  Tatsuma Ito
  Aslan Karatsev
  Dušan Lajović
  Pere Riba

Withdrawals
Before the tournament
  Pablo Andújar →replaced by  Mikhail Youzhny
  Marcel Granollers →replaced by  Andrey Kuznetsov

Retirements
  Simone Bolelli (leg injury)
  Pere Riba (leg injury)

ATP doubles main-draw entrants

Seeds

1 Rankings are as of October 12, 2015

Other entrants
The following pairs received wildcards into the doubles main draw:
  Richard Muzaev /  Anton Zaitcev
  Andrey Rublev /  Dmitry Tursunov

Withdrawals
Before the tournament
  Pere Riba (leg injury)

WTA singles main-draw entrants

Seeds

 Rankings are as of October 12, 2015

Other entrants
The following players received wildcards into the singles main draw:
  Flavia Pennetta
  Karolína Plíšková
  Elena Vesnina

The following players received entry from the qualifying draw:
  Daria Kasatkina
  Klára Koukalová
  Aliaksandra Sasnovich
  Anastasija Sevastova

The following players received entry as lucky losers:
  Ana Bogdan
  Paula Kania

Withdrawals
Before the tournament
  Angelique Kerber (back injury)→replaced by  Ana Bogdan
  Petra Kvitová →replaced by  Kateřina Siniaková
  Karin Knapp →replaced by  Olga Govortsova
  Ekaterina Makarova →replaced by  Aleksandra Krunić
  Agnieszka Radwańska (right shoulder injury) →replaced by  Paula Kania

During the tournament
  Flavia Pennetta (right foot injury)

WTA doubles main-draw entrants

Seeds

1 Rankings are as of October 12, 2015

Other entrants
The following pairs received wildcards into the doubles main draw:
  Anastasia Bukhanko /  Iva Majoli
  Daria Kasatkina /  Elena Vesnina

Champions

Men's singles

 Marin Čilić def.  Roberto Bautista Agut, 6–4, 6–4

Women's singles

  Svetlana Kuznetsova def.  Anastasia Pavlyuchenkova 6–2, 6–1

Men's doubles

 Andrey Rublev /  Dmitry Tursunov def.  Radu Albot /  František Čermák, 2–6, 6–1, [10–6]

Women's doubles

  Daria Kasatkina /  Elena Vesnina def.  Irina-Camelia Begu /  Monica Niculescu 6–3, 6–7(7–9), [10–5]

References

External links
 

Kremlin Cup
Kremlin Cup
Kremlin Cup
Kremlin Cup
Kremlin Cup
Kremlin Cup